Peter Collier may refer to:
 Peter Collier (politician) (born 1959), Australian politician
 Peter Collier (writer) (1939–2019), American writer and founder of Encounter Books 
 Peter Fenelon Collier (1849–1909), Irish-American publisher, founder of Collier's Weekly